Hartley House, also known as the Bond-Bates-Hartley House, is a historic home located at Batesburg-Leesville, Lexington County, South Carolina. It was built before 1800, and is a -story, weatherboard dwelling with a two-story portico adapted from the Greek Revival. It has a closed brick foundation and a gable roof. The portico is supported by two square wooden pillars set outside a pair of smaller pillars. According to local tradition, the house served as a stagecoach stop and post office prior to the founding of Batesburg.

It was listed on the National Register of Historic Places in 1982.

References

Houses on the National Register of Historic Places in South Carolina
Greek Revival architecture in South Carolina
Houses completed in 1830
Houses in Lexington County, South Carolina
National Register of Historic Places in Lexington County, South Carolina